Leeds South was a federal electoral district in Ontario, Canada, that was represented in the House of Commons of Canada from 1867 to 1904. It was created by the British North America Act of 1867 which divided the County of Leeds into two ridings: a north riding and a south riding. The north riding was combined with the North Riding of the County of Grenville. The riding did not change its boundaries during its existence. It consisted of the Townships of North Crosby, South Crosby, Burgess South, Bastard, Leeds, Lansdowne, Escott and Yonge.

The electoral district was abolished in 1903 when it was merged into Leeds riding.

Electoral history

See also 

 List of Canadian federal electoral districts
 Past Canadian electoral districts

External links 
 Parliamentary website

References

Former federal electoral districts of Ontario